Kumta is a town and taluk in the Uttara Kannada district of Karnataka, India. It is one of the important stations along the Konkan Railway line running between Mumbai and Mangalore.

Geography 
The city of Kumta is located on the Arabian sea coast in the district of North Kannada in the state of Karnataka. Kumta is adjacent to the vast western ghats  . It has an average elevation of 3 metres (9 feet).

To the north of city, the major Aghanashini river joins the Arabian Sea on her way rendering stunning scenery. The town of Gokarna near Kumta is famous for beaches. A nearby Rock Climbing spot called Yana is also beautiful with its massive black rock formations and nature trails.

Transportation

Road 

Kumta is very well connected by road. One of the busiest highway National Highway 66 (NH 66-Panvel-Kochi-Kanyakumari) passes through Kumta. Kumta is also connected to State Highway-142 (SH 142 - Kumta-Sirsi) and also to Kumta-Siddapur Road It connects the NH 69 in Talaguppa.

The North Western Karnataka Road Transport Corporation (NWKRTC) is the state run bus service in Kumta.

Rail

Kumta station is served by the Netravati Express train run by Konkan Railways.

Kumta rail connects Mangalore and Goa which further connects to Bombay)
Kumta station is also served by Matsyagandha Express, CSMT Manglore Express and many more

See also 
 Hegde (village)
 H. R. Manjanath

References

External links

Cities and towns in Uttara Kannada district